Louis Lichtenfield (June 1, 1919 – September 12, 2003) was an American special effects artist, he was nominated for Best Special Effects at the 30th Academy Awards for the film The Spirit of St. Louis.

Filmography
The Silver Chalice (1954)
Helen of Troy (1956)
The Spirit of St. Louis (1957)
No Time for Sergeants (1958)
King Kong (1976)
Flash Gordon (1980)

References

External links

1919 births
2003 deaths
Special effects people